Schauenburg Castle is a ruined hilltop castle located in Oberkirch, Germany, atop a  (NN) hill spur overlooking the Rench river valley above the town of Gaisbach, Baden-Württemberg. The castle was built by Duke Berthold II of Zähringen.

The well-preserved ruin includes the remains of two towers with living quarters, a gate tower, a rampart, and a shield wall with an attached chapel. The remains of an outer bailey are surrounded by a dry moat and a second shield wall.

The castle is now a tourist attraction and includes a small museum in the cellar of the former castle chapel and a restaurant.

History 
Schauenburg Castle was built in the 10th century by Duke Berthold II of Zähringen and was first mentioned in a written text in 1120. The Palatinate, Gottfried von Calw (d 1131, Count of Calw, Count-Palatine of bei Rhein, 1113–1126) came into possession of the castle through his marriage to Liutgard von Zähringen. On his death it passed to his granddaughter Uta, Duchess of Eberstein. Schauenburg Castle is noted as a part of the dowry upon her marriage to Duke Welf VI, a brother of Henry X, Duke of Bavaria in 1131. After Uta's death, the Sindelfinger Chronicles note that the castle passed to Uta's brother Eberhard, founder of the All Saints' Abbey. Schauenburg Castle remained in the possession of the Counts of Eberstein until the financial ruin of Wolf von Eberstein. In 1386, half of the possessions of the Ebersteins, including Schauenburg Castle, was sold to Rudolf VII, Margrave of Baden-Baden (d. 1391).

The knights of Schauenburg became a separate noble family, working as Ministerialis and Burgmann under the Ebersteins. After the death of Ludwig Winterbach von Schauenburg, the last of his line, there was a dispute between Heinrich Truchseß von Höfingen and the other line of the Schauenburg family as to who possessed the fiefdom. The family Schauenburg wanted the Schauenburg to remain a Ganerbenburg, whereas Heinrich wanted sole fiefdom. This led to the Feud of the lords of Schauenburg with Bernhard von Baden, a two-year war from 1402 to 1403. This resulted, in 1404, with Schauenburg Castle remaining with the Eberstein family.

During its time as an active castle, it was besieged many times and overrun twice. After at least two different demolitions (probably during 1689 by Vauban and Mélac in the Nine Years' War) the castle was ruined and, in the 17th century, stones from the castle were used in the building of Gaisbach Castle by Hans Jakob Christoffel von Grimmelshausen, the author of the Baroque satire Simplicius Simplicissimus. The castle has been a preserved ruin since the 18th century and today the castle is owned by the Freiherren von Schauenburg.

Notes and references

Further reading 
 Max Miller, Gerhard Taddey: Handbuch der historischen Stätten Deutschlands. Band 6. Baden-Württemberg. Stuttgart 1965.
 Alexander Antonow: Burgen des südwestdeutschen Raums im 13. und 14. Jahrhundert – unter besonderer Berücksichtigung der Schildmauer. Verlag Konkordia, Bühl/Baden 1977, pp. 246–248.
 Kurt Klein: Burgen, Schlösser und Ruinen - Zeugen der Vergangenheit im Ortenaukreis. Reiff Schwarzwaldverlag, Offenburg 1997, pp. 74–75.
 Friedrich-Wilhelm Krahe: Burgen des deutschen Mittelalters – Grundriss-Lexikon. Sonderausgabe. Flechsig Verlag, Würzburg 2000, p. 537.
 Wolfgang Zimmermann: Unterwegs zu Burgen und Schlössern im Schwarzwald. Ausflüge und Wanderungen zu den schönsten und interessantesten Burgen und Schlössern. Fink-Kümmerly und Frey, Ostfildern 1981, .
 Dieter Buck: Burgen und Ruinen im nördlichen Schwarzwald – 33 Ausflüge auf den Spuren der Ritter. Konrad Theiss Verlag, Stuttgart 2002, pp. 54–57.
 Hans-Martin Pillin: Die Schauenburg. In: Burgen und Schlösser in Mittelbaden/Historischer Verein für Mittelbaden. Hrsg.: Hugo Schneider, Offenburg 1984, pp. 204–216 (Digitalised).
 Bertha Freifrau von Schauenburg: Die Ruine Schauenburg. In: Die Ortenau: Zeitschrift des Historischen Vereins für Mittelbaden, 21. Heft: Burgen und Schlösser Mittelbadens. 1934, pp. 259–270 (Digitalised).
 Max Wingenroth: Die Kunstdenkmäler des Kreises Offenburg (= Die Kunstdenkmäler des Grossherzogthums Baden Bd. 7). Tübingen 1908, pp. 157–177 (Digitalised).

External links 

  
"Ruine Schauenburg Oberkirch". www.schwarzwald-informationen.de. 
 
 Die Schauenburg bei badenpage.de
 Burg Schauenburg bei burgenwelt.de
 Die Schauenburg bei badischewanderungen.de
 Die Schauenburg auf Schlösser und Burgen in Baden-Württemberg

Ruined castles in Germany
Hill castles